The French football club SC Bastia in its 1997–98 season finished in the 13th place in the league. The top scorer of the season, scoring 9 goals in 5 league matches, wasn Ermin Šiljak. The club was eliminated from the Coupe de France round of 64. In the Coupe de la Ligue it was able to reach the round of 32 teams. It also became the Intertoto Cup winner and advanced to the second round of the UEFA Cup.

Transfers

In 
Summer
 Éric Durand and Frédéric Mendy from Martigues
 Laurent Casanova and Christophe Deguerville from Lyon
 Pascual Garrido from Boca Juniors
 Franck Jurietti from Gueugnon
 Pierre-Yves André from Rennes
 Jean-Jacques Etamé from Cannes
 Nenad Jestrović from OFK Belgrade
 Ľubomír Moravčík from Sion
 Prince Daye from Invincible Eleven
 Hervé Sekli and François Modesto from Bastia B

Winter
 Ali Boumnijel from Gueugnon
 Ardian Kozniku from APOEL
 Pierre Laurent from Leeds United
 Nicolas Penneteau from Bastia B

Out 
Summer
 Patrick Valéry to Blackburn Rovers
 Ľubomír Moravčík, Jean-Jacques Eydelie and Pascal Camadini to Sion
 Laurent Moracchini to Nancy
 Didier Santini to Toulouse
 Pierre Maroselli to Rennes
 Anto Drobnjak to Lens
 Franck Vandecasteele to Nice
 Jamie Fullarton to Crystal Palace
 Laurent Weber to Troyes

Winter
 Ermin Siljak to Servette
 Jean-Jacques Etamé to Saint-Louisienne

Squad

French Division 1

League table

Results summary

Results by round

Matches

Coupe de France

Coupe de la Ligue

Europe

UEFA Intertoto Cup

Group stage 

Matches

Qualifying

UEFA Cup

First round 

Bastia won 1–0 on aggregate.

Second round 

Steaua Bucharest 3–3 Bastia on aggregate. Steaua Bucharest won on away goals rule.

Statistics

Top scorers

League assists

References 

SC Bastia seasons
Bastia